The Battle of Alexandropol was a conflict between the First Republic of Armenia and Turkish Revolutionaries of the Turkish National Movement which was on November 7, 1920 at Alexandropol.

Background

The Turkish-Armenian War was a conflict fought between the Republic of Armenia and Turkish Revolutionaries of the Turkish National Movement which lasted from 24 September to 2 December 1920 and largely took place in present-day northeastern Turkey and northwestern Armenia.

Active Stage
On October 24, Karabekir's forces launched a massive campaign on Kars. Rather than fighting for the city, the Armenians abandoned Kars which by October 30 came under full Turkish control. Alexandropol was occupied by Turkish troops on November 7. Turkish troops were withdrawn from her after Treaty of Kars.

Results

The Treaty of Alexandropol was a peace treaty between the Democratic Republic of Armenia and TBMM ending the Turkish-Armenian War, before declaration of the Republic of Turkey on December 2, 1920. Armenian was forced to renounce the Treaty of Sèvres and cede over 50% of her claimed territory to Turkey. The treaty was to be ratified by the government within a month. This did not take place due to the Soviet occupation of Armenia and in 1921 was replaced with the Treaty of Kars.

References

Conflicts in 1920
Battles of the Turkish–Armenian War
1920 in Armenia
1920 in the Ottoman Empire
November 1920 events